Xiayang may refer to the following locations in the People's Republic of China:

 Xiayang Lake (下洋湖), a  lake in Huangshi, Hubei
 Xiayang, Hunan (霞阳镇), town in Yanling County
 Xiayang, Guangdong (下洋镇), town in Xuwen County

Fujian 
 Xiayang, Nanping (峡阳镇), town in Yanping District
 Xiayang, Yongchun County (下洋镇), town
 Xiayang, Yongding County (下洋镇), town
 Xiayang Township (夏阳乡), Mingxi County